Herpetopoma xeniolum is a species of sea snail, a marine gastropod mollusk in the family Chilodontidae.

D.G. Herbert (2012) wasn't convinced that this poorly known species belonged in the genus Herpetopoma and puts it in Herpetopoma sensu lato.

Description
The length of the shell attains 3.7 mm

The whorls of this relatively high-spired shell are rather flat-sided and show a fine sculpture. Some of the denticles of the outer lip extend into the aperture. There is a number of variation in the spiral cords of the examined specimens.

Distribution
This species occurs in the Indo-West Pacific, in the Gulf of Oman and off Réunion, New Caledonia and the Philippines; as a fossil from the Pliocene off Fiji.

References

 Vilvens C. & Heros V. 2003. Description of Herpetopoma eboreum n.sp. (Gastropoda : Trochisae: Eucyclinae: Chilodoniini) from New Caledonia. Novapex 4(2–3): 61–65
  Poppe G.T., Tagaro S.P. & Dekker H. (2006) The Seguenziidae, Chilodontidae, Trochidae, Calliostomatidae and Solariellidae of the Philippine Islands. Visaya Supplement 2: 1–228.

External links
 
 H. S. Ladd. 1982. Cenozoic fossil mollusks from Western Pacific Islands; Gastropods (Volutidae through Terebridae). United States Geological Survey Professional Paper 1171:1–100 

xeniolum
Gastropods described in 1918